Mary Adele France, also known as M. Adele France (February 17, 1880 in Chestertown, Maryland – September 16, 1954 in Catonsville, Maryland), was the first president of St. Mary's Female Seminary Junior College, which is now a coeducational, four-year public honors college, known as St. Mary's College of Maryland. She is credited with expanding St. Mary's Female Seminary into a junior college. She was both the last principal of the seminary and the first president of the college.

She was also the supervisor of the Kent County, Maryland Elementary Schools, and supervisor of the Shelby, Tennessee school system. She was also a math and science teacher.

Early life
France graduated from Washington College in Maryland in 1905. She was the fifth female graduate of the institution.

Career

Teaching
France was a math and science teacher. She first taught at St. Mary's Female Seminary in the 1900s and 1910s, then she taught at a few other schools in Maryland.

Superintendent of schools
In 1918 she became the superintendent of elementary schools in Kent County, Maryland followed by a position as superintendent of schools in Shelby County, Tennessee in 1921.

Return to St. Mary's Female Seminary as Principal
France later returned to St. Mary's Female Seminary and became its principal.

Role in expanding school to a junior college, appointment as president
While in this role, she developed the idea of expanding the school into a junior college. After lobbying the Maryland state legislature for some time, she was successful and the school was expanded into a junior college in 1926 and renamed "St. Mary's Female Seminary Junior College".

Adelle based her rationale for expanding the school into a college on women recently gaining the right to vote.

1942: Conferral of Honorary Degree from Washington College
Mary Adele France received an honorary degree in 1942 from Washington College "for her significant contributions to the education of young women." Eleanor Roosevelt also received an honorary degree at the graduation ceremony.

Death
Mary Adelle France died in 1954.

Legacy
The college that France helped to establish is now coeducational and a four-year public honors college, known as St. Mary's College of Maryland.

External links
 St. Mary's College of Maryland narrative historical timeline more details of Mary Adele France's tenure at the school
 St. Mary's College of Maryland online archives photos of Mary Adele France throughout her career
 Washington College online archives, notable alumni short bio of Mary Adele France

References

1880 births
1954 deaths
American suffragists
St. Mary's College of Maryland
St. Mary's College of Maryland faculty
St. Mary's City, Maryland
Washington College alumni
American women academics